Piet Kooyman (3 June 1929 – 7 April 1988) was a Dutch road cyclist who was active between 1950 and 1957. He won the overall Olympia's Tour in 1955 and one stage of the Olympia's Tour in 1957.

References

1929 births
1988 deaths
Dutch male cyclists
Cyclists from The Hague